The Immoralist is a play written by Augustus and Ruth Goetz based on the novel of the same name by André Gide. The original production starred James Dean, Louis Jourdan, and Geraldine Page.

Plot
A gay archaeologist marries partly in hope of curbing his homosexual instincts. He is unable to consummate the marriage so the pair travel from Normandy to Algeria for a honeymoon, hoping that will kindle some romance. The husband is seduced by their Arab houseboy, but this allows him to sleep with his wife, who falls pregnant.

Cast

Background
The play was produced by Billy Rose and was adapted by Ruth and Augustus Goetz. The original director was Herman Shumlin.

Jourdan and Page had very different approaches to acting which resulted in a difficult rehearsal process. James Dean's behaviour was erratic as well. At the beginning of try outs, Rose replaced Schumlin with Daniel Mann; he also wanted to fire Dean but Page insisted the actor stay.

"Dean was not very happy playing the young Arab," recalled his friend Hal Hackady later. "He didn't like the plot. I also believe he didn't like playing a homosexual on Broadway. He felt uncomfortable."

Elia Kazan saw the show during previews and offered Dean a role in East of Eden. Dean quit the show on opening night. He was replaced by Phillip Pine. The show ran for 96 performances.

References

External links

 (archive) at Playbill
The Immoralist at Monsieur.louisjourdan.net
Tommy Brent press files on The Immoralist, 1963, held by the Billy Rose Theatre Division, New York Public Library for the Performing Arts

1954 plays
Plays based on novels
Broadway plays
Algeria in fiction